was the second son of Itakura Katsuzumi. Third Itakura Daimyō of Bitchū-Matsuyama Domain.

Family
 Father: Itakura Katsuzumi
 Mother: Nezu clan's daughter
 Wife: Okadaira Masasumi's daughter

Title

Daimyo
1750 births
Itakura clan
1778 deaths